Electoral Commission of Kenya refers to the now defunct commission that was disbanded by the 10th Parliament in 2008 and replaced with the Interim Independent Electoral Commission of Kenya. Samuel Kivuitu the last Chairman of the Commission and the commissioners at the time of disbanding, in November, 2008, moved to court to contest the disbanding of the Commission. They claim that the disbanding was unconstitutional as a tribunal should have been set up to investigate the wrongdoing on their part in the 2007 Presidential election. The next hearing for the suit will on February 3, 2010 at the Constitutional Court.
Elections in kenya is now under the IEBC

See also
 Constitution of Kenya
 10th Kenyan Parliament
 Kenyan presidential election, 2007
 Kriegler Commission

References

External links 
  (through archive.org)

Politics of Kenya
Law of Kenya
Kenya